Cássio Vasconcellos (born 1965) is a Brazilian photographer.

Life and work
Vasconcellos was born in São Paulo, Brazil.

He began his career in 1981 with photographic journalism and artistic projects, specializing in aerial photography.

Publications
Noturnos São Paulo (Nocturnes São Paulo). Bookmark, São Paulo, Brazil, 2002. .
Aéreas (Aerials). Terra Virgem, São Paulo, Brazil, 2010. .
Panorâmicas (Panoramics). DBA, São Paulo, Brazil, 2012. .
Coletivos (Collectives). Quarantena, 2020.

Exhibitions

Solo exhibitions
Noturnos (Nocturnes), São Paulo, Brazil, 2010
Cássio Vasconcellos, Today Art Museum, Peking, China, 2013

Awards 
1995: National Photography Award, National Foundation of the Arts (FUNARTE), Brazil
1999: J.P. Morgan Photography Award, São Paulo, Brazil
2001: Porto Seguro Photography Award, São Paulo, Brazil
2002: Best Photography Exhibition of the Year, Associação Paulista de Críticos de Arte (São Paulo Art Critics Association), São Paulo, Brazil
2018: Juror's pick, LensCulture Art Photography Awards

References

External links

Brazilian photographers
Aerial photographers
1965 births
Living people
People from São Paulo